Stuart Hughes is an English politician representing voters at all three levels of local government in Devon, in the West of England. He represents Sidmouth Sidford as a councillor on East Devon District Council and on Devon County Council, where he is currently Cabinet member for Highways Management. He is also a Sidmouth town councillor.

After twice standing unsuccessfully for the House of Commons as a Raving Loony, he was elected at the district and county level in Devon in 1991 and 1993 for the Raving Loony Green Giant Party, becoming the party's first successful candidate at a contested election of any kind. However, he defected to the Conservatives in 1997 and has been elected for them ever since.

Career
Hughes became a disc jockey in 1969. In the 1980s, he was a hotelier also an active member of the Official Monster Ravig Loony Party. At the European Parliament election, 1989, Hughes stood for the Official Monster Raving Loony Party in the Devon constituency of the European Parliament, gaining 2,241 votes, less than 1% of the votes cast.

In 1989, he and others formed the breakaway Raving Loony Green Giant Party (RLGGP), mainly due to personality clashes with their local party leader, Howling Laud Hope.

He stood for parliament at the Mid Staffordshire by-election of 22 March 1990 and the Ribble Valley by-election of 7 March 1991, using the party labels "Raving Loony Green Giant Supercalafragalistic Party" and "Raving Loony Green Giant Clitheroe Kid" respectively. In Mid Staffordshire, he gained 59 votes, but improved on this in Ribble Valley to score 60.

In May 1991, Hughes was elected under the Raving Loony Green Giant Party banner to East Devon District Council and Sidmouth Town Council in the Sidmouth Woolbrook ward, after changing his name to 'Stuart Basil Fawlty Hughes', becoming the first "Raving Loony" candidate to win a contested election. He formed an alliance of Independents and a sole Green Party councillor which was known as "The Coastals", because of the seaside seats they held. In 1993, Hughes was elected as a Raving Loony to Devon County Council, representing the Sidmouth Rural county division.

Hughes joined the Conservatives in March 1997. This was just in time to stand as a Conservative candidate at the 1997 local elections, when he was re-elected to Devon County Council. He was re-elected again at the 2001, 2005, and 2009 elections.

A supporter of the Sidmouth Folk Week, during the early 2000s Hughes was still organising local live musical events, staging bands such as The Strawbs and The Wurzels. Some forty years on from his debut as a disc jockey, he is still operating the 'Stuart Hughes Disco Show', using a Remote Control Frequencies sound system, a light show with LED technology and laser.

In Devon County Council, Hughes is currently the Cabinet member for Highways Management, and he also remains a member of East Devon District Council, where he served as the Cabinet portfolio holder for Communications from 2003 to 2011. He previously served as Chairman of the county's Environment Economy and Culture Overview Scrutiny Committee.

Hughes is also a member of the South West Regional Flood & Coastal Committee, President of Sidmouth Town Football Club, Chairman of PATROL Parking & Traffic Regulations Outside London & Chairman of LGA Public Transport Consortium  "Climate change poses the greatest threat to Sidmouth", and his political priorities include a coastal protection scheme, the creation of employment in the Sid Valley, maximising the potential of the Jurassic Coast World Heritage Site, and pedestrianisation.

At the 2009 Devon County Council election, Hughes won 3,553 votes, being 70.7 per cent of the votes cast, and had a majority of 2,428 over the Liberal Democrat runner-up.

Notes

External links
stuarthughes.co.uk – official web site

Year of birth missing (living people)
Living people
Conservative Party (UK) councillors
Official Monster Raving Loony Party politicians
Members of Devon County Council
People from Sidmouth
Councillors in Devon
British political candidates